The 1943 Kansas State Wildcats football team represented Kansas State University in the 1943 college football season. The team's head football coach was Ward Haylett, in his second year at the helm of the Wildcats. The Wildcats played their home games in Memorial Stadium. The Wildcats finished the season with a 1–7 record with a 0–5 record in conference play. They finished in last place in the Big Six Conference.  The Wildcats scored 48 points and gave up 209 points.

Schedule

References

Kansas State
Kansas State Wildcats football seasons
Kansas State Wildcats football